Pnar, also known as Jaiñtia is an Austroasiatic language spoken in India and Bangladesh.

Phonology 
Pnar has 30 phonemes: 7 vowels and 23 consonants. Other sounds listed below are phonetic realizations.

Vowels 

There is also one diphthong: /ia/.

Consonants

Syllable structure 
Syllables in Pnar can consist of a single nucleic vowel. Maximally, they can include a complex onset of two consonants, a diphthong nucleus, and a coda consonant. A second type of syllable contains a syllabic nasal/trill/lateral immediately following the onset consonant. This syllabic consonant behaves as the rhyme. (Ring, 2012: 141–2)

References

External links 
 http://projekt.ht.lu.se/rwaai RWAAI (Repository and Workspace for Austroasiatic Intangible Heritage)
 http://hdl.handle.net/10050/00-0000-0000-0003-D187-C@view Pnar in RWAAI Digital Archive
 Pnar DoReCo corpus compiled by Hiram Ring. Audio recordings of narrative texts with transcriptions time-aligned at the phone level, translations, and time-aligned morphological annotations.

Khasian languages
Languages of Bangladesh
Languages of Meghalaya